Maryland Route 39 (MD 39) is a state highway in the U.S. state of Maryland.  Known for much of its length as Hutton Road, the state highway begins at the West Virginia state line in Hutton, where the highway continues west as West Virginia Route 7 (WV 7).  MD 39, which is the westernmost state-numbered highway in Maryland, runs  from Hutton east through Crellin to U.S. Route 219 (US 219) in Oakland.  The state highway was constructed in the early 1920s.

Route description

MD 39 begins at the West Virginia state line in Hutton adjacent to CSX's Mountain Subdivision railroad line.  WV 7 continues west from the state line toward Terra Alta.  MD 39 heads southeast as two-lane undivided Hutton Road through the village of Hutton.  The state highway skirts the hamlet of Crellin before crossing the Youghiogheny River and turning northeast.  At Old Crellin Road, MD 39 veers north and enters the town limits of Oakland, where the highway becomes Oak Street.  MD 39 curves to the east, then crosses the Little Youghiogheny River into downtown Oakland.  After crossing over the Mountain Subdivision tracks, the state highway meets its eastern terminus at US 219.  US 219 heads north from the intersection as Third Street and east as a continuation of Oak Street.

History
MD 39 was under construction by 1919 between Oakland and Crellin.  The highway was completed to just east of the Youghiogheny River in 1921.  MD 39 was extended across the river through Hutton to the West Virginia state line in 1923.

Junction list

Auxiliary route
MD 39A is an unnamed  connector between MD 39 and MD 827C in Crellin.

See also

References

External links

MDRoads: MD 39
Maryland Roads - MD 39

039
Maryland Route 039